The Chiller Cabinet was a radio show created by Ben Eshmade in 2002. The two-hour show presents a range of "ambience, minimalism & movies on the radio" twice weekly. The show distinctively focuses on the above named areas of music and is blended continuously without voiceovers. Quickly after its first international broadcasts by Classic FM it attracted a cult following.

The Chiller Cabinet released a compilation CD called Chiller Cabinet on 27 January 2004.

External links
Official website

Ambient music radio programs